Proctophyllodes is a genus of feather mites, found on passerine birds.

References

External links 

Sarcoptiformes
Parasites of birds